Katherine Esther Jackson (née Scruse, born Kattie B. Screws; May 4, 1930) is the matriarch of the Jackson family of entertainers that includes her children Michael and Janet Jackson.

Early life
Jackson was born as Kattie B. Screws on May 4, 1930 in Clayton, Alabama, the elder daughter of Martha (née Upshaw; December 14, 1902 – April 30, 1990) and Prince Albert Screws (October 16, 1907 – January 21, 1997). Jackson contracted polio at the age of two, which left her with a noticeable limp. In 1934, her father changed his surname to Scruse, and renamed her to Katherine Esther Scruse.

As a child, Jackson aspired to become an actress or country singer, but was dismayed to find no notable black country stars. Her parents divorced when she was still a child. She joined her high school band while she was a student at Washington High School in East Chicago, Indiana.

Matriarch of the Jackson family

In 1947, Scruse met Joseph "Joe" Jackson, a fellow resident of East Chicago, Indiana. Scruse and Joe began dating after obtaining an annulment of his earlier marriage. The couple married on November 5, 1949, after dating for a year. In January 1950, they purchased a two-bedroom house on 2300 Jackson Street in Gary, Indiana. The house had just two bedrooms, a living room, a kitchen and a small utility room for the washing machine and freezer. Their sons slept in bunk beds in one bedroom, Jackson and Joe in the other, while their daughters slept in the living room. From 1950 until 1966, Jackson and Joe had 10 children, including twins Marlon and Brandon, the latter of whom died a few hours after birth. Those children are:

Maureen Reillette "Rebbie" Jackson (born May 29, 1950)
Sigmund Esco "Jackie" Jackson (born May 4, 1951)
Toriano Adaryll "Tito" Jackson (born October 15, 1953)
Jermaine La Jaune Jackson (born December 11, 1954)
La Toya Yvonne Jackson (born May 29, 1956)
Marlon David Jackson (born March 12, 1957)
Brandon David Jackson (born and died March 12, 1957); 2 months premature
Michael Joseph Jackson (August 29, 1958 – June 25, 2009)
Steven Randall "Randy" Jackson (born October 29, 1961)
Janet Damita Jo Jackson (born May 16, 1966)

The Jackson 5 

The Jackson 5 was founded in 1964 in Gary, Indiana. It included brothers Jackie, Tito, and Jermaine, with younger brothers Marlon and Michael joining soon after. The Jackson 5 performed in talent shows and clubs on the Chitlin' Circuit, then signed with Steeltown Records in 1967 and released two singles. The group was managed by Joe Jackson. In 1968, the group left Steeltown Records and signed with Motown and Berry Gordy, where they were the first group to debut with four consecutive number one hits on the Billboard Hot 100 with the songs "I Want You Back", "ABC", "The Love You Save", and "I'll Be There".

During the couple's early years in Gary, Jackson sang together with Joe playing the guitar. Joe and his brother Luther also formed an R&B band in the mid-1950s called the Falcons, for extra income. Joe had a boxing career, but later went on to work as a crane operator at East Chicago's Inland Steel Company to support the family. Jackson a devout Jehovah's Witness began working part-time at Sears in Gary. She played the instruments clarinet and piano on the side. Jackson caught baby Michael dancing to the old, rickety washing machine, a Maytag early on. Jackson knew Michael had rhythm and loved music. Their son, Tito, would sneak to play Joe’s guitar while Joe was not home and one day broke a guitar string. After the guitar was fixed, Tito played for Joe. That sparked the forming of the family group Jackson named “The Jackson Brothers 5”, that later became the Jackson 5.   While Joe led the rehearsals in the living room, Jackson designed and hand sewed the stage outfits for the boys, and visited The Salvation Army for shoes. Jackson also spent time singing harmonies with the boys around the kitchen table. Jackson served as the family's backbone.

Personal life

Jackson filed for divorce in March 1973, but chose to rescind the divorce papers. In August 1974, Joe and Cheryl Terrell's daughter, Joh'Vonnie Jackson, was born. Jackson would again file for divorce in 1982, but again would rescind the papers. Jackson and Joe would remain legally married until Joe's death in 2018. Despite rumours that the couple were estranged, Jackson denied them. In 1990, Jackson released her autobiography, My Family, The Jacksons, which documented her early years and her relationship with her husband and their children, eight of whom wrote salutes to their mother in the book's foreword.

In 1980, Jackson and her two youngest children, Randy and Janet, confronted a woman who worked for Joe's company, whom Jackson had often reportedly accused of cheating with Joe. The incident was redramatized for the 1992 miniseries The Jacksons: An American Dream. In the miniseries, Jackson was shown confronting Joe instead of the woman about the alleged incident. During the late 1980s, Jackson began experiencing an estrangement from her daughter La Toya after she was being managed by husband Jack Gordon. In her 1991 memoir La Toya: Growing Up in the Jackson Family, La Toya alleged that Jackson was emotionally abusive, charges Jackson denied and blamed La Toya's husband for "brainwashing" her. In 1997, La Toya and her mother reconciled after she filed for divorce from Gordon.

Michael dedicated his 1982 album Thriller to her. Janet did the same following the release of her 1989 album Rhythm Nation 1814. In 1985, acknowledging the positive impact on her children's successful music careers, national urban magazine Essence honored her as "Mother of the Year".

Jackson was portrayed by Angela Bassett in the 1992 miniseries The Jacksons: An American Dream. Patricia Idlette portrayed her in the 2004 film Man in the Mirror: The Michael Jackson Story. In a 2010 interview on The Oprah Winfrey Show, Jackson acknowledged that her husband had admitted to having physically disciplined their children. Over the years, some claimed that Joe was abusive toward his children, to which he continually denied.

Later years 

On June 25, 2009, Michael Jackson died from cardiac arrest and an overdose of propofol. In July 2009, Katherine and Debbie Rowe, the mother of Michael's two oldest children, reached a settlement pertaining to the care of Rowe's children, Prince and Paris. The agreement provided that the children would be raised by Katherine and Rowe would have visitation rights and would continue to receive the yearly payments to which Michael had agreed. On August 3, 2009, a judge named Jackson as the children's permanent guardian.

As of 2011, Jackson resided at her home in Calabasas, California with her grandson, TJ Jackson, and his family. Jackson moved out of her Hayvenhurst home in Encino, California due to house renovations.

On July 25, 2012, Jackson's guardianship of the children was suspended by the court amid allegations that she may have been held against her will by several Jackson family members as a result of a financial dispute between those family members and Michael's estate. Guardianship of the children was temporarily given to Michael's nephew, TJ Jackson, son of Tito Jackson . Jackson's guardianship later resumed, with TJ Jackson added as a co-guardian.

On November 1, 2017, Jackson resigned as co-guardian of Michael's youngest son, Bigi. Jackson stated her reasons for resigning included her own advanced age, the fact that Michael's oldest children Prince and Paris Jackson were now adults, and that Bigi was now 15 years old. TJ Jackson was, without objection, awarded sole custody of Bigi.

References

External links

1930 births
Living people
20th-century African-American people
20th-century African-American women
21st-century African-American people
21st-century African-American women
African-American women writers
American autobiographers
American Jehovah's Witnesses
Converts to Jehovah's Witnesses
Former Baptists
Katherine Jackson
People from Clayton, Alabama
People from East Chicago, Indiana
People from Gary, Indiana
People from Los Angeles
People with polio
Women autobiographers